The Best & the Rest is a greatest hits compilation by Polish singer Kayah, released in 2005 by Sony BMG Music Entertainment Poland.

Background
The retrospective collects all of Kayah's biggest hits on disc 1, including a new song, "Jutro rano", and re-recordings of "Na językach" and her debut 1988 single "Córeczko". Disc 2 consists mainly of songs recorded for various projects, previously not available on any Kayah album, and remixes. The Best & the Rest was the singer's final album released under contract with Sony BMG. "Jutro rano" was released as a single and became a radio hit in Poland. The album debuted atop Polish album sales chart and held the position for three consecutive weeks. It was certified gold in Poland.

Track listing
CD 1 – The Best
"Jutro rano" (feat. Smolik) – 3:10
"Prócz ciebie, nic" (feat. Krzysztof Kiljański) – 3:36
"Do D.N.A." – 4:32
"Testosteron" – 3:07
"Embarcação" (feat. Cesária Évora) – 3:26
"Anioł wiedział" – 3:40
"Jaka ja Kayah" – 4:53
"Nie ma, nie ma ciebie" (feat. Goran Bregović) – 3:49
"To nie ptak" (feat. Goran Bregović) – 4:40
"Prawy do lewego" (feat. Goran Bregović) – 3:25
"Śpij kochanie, śpij" (feat. Goran Bregović) – 4:31
"Supermenka" – 3:36
"Na językach" – 4:48
"Fleciki" – 5:02
"Santana" – 4:40
"Córeczko" – 2:58

CD 2 – The Rest
"Wybacz kochanie" – 2:23
"Jestem zła" – 3:12
"Życie jest darem" – 4:47
"Najpiękniejsi" (feat. Poluzjanci) – 3:57
"Wiosna przyjdzie i tak" – 3:14
"Testosteron" (Orkiestra Mix) – 3:16
"Uwierz... to nie ja" (feat. Urszula) – 4:16
"Jaka ja Kayah" (Smolik Mix) – 7:14
"Anioł wiedział" (Smolik Mix) – 6:04
"Miłość ci wszystko wybaczy" (feat. Goran Bregović) – 2:50
"Dobry potwór nie jest zły" (feat. Roch) – 2:43
"Duchy tych co mieszkali tu" – 3:23
"Hit" (feat. Michał Urbaniak and Rejs) – 3:58
"Amen" (feat. Věra Bílá and Chico & the Gypsies) – 3:10

Charts

Certifications

References

External links
 The Best & the Rest on Discogs
 The official Kayah website

2005 compilation albums
Kayah (singer) albums
Polish-language compilation albums